Murat Šaran (24 October 1949 – 3 June 2021) was a Bosnian professional footballer who played as a forward.

Club career
Šaran started his career with Sarajevo-based lower-tier side Igman Ilidža before making his move to FK Sarajevo where he spent seven years and established himself as a first team regular. He went on to play for Bor, Rijeka and Čelik, before making a move to Spain where he joined Levante for two seasons before retiring in 1981.

References

1949 births
2021 deaths
Footballers from Sarajevo
Association football forwards
Yugoslav footballers
FK Sarajevo players
FK Bor players
HNK Rijeka players
NK Čelik Zenica players
Levante UD footballers
Yugoslav First League players
Segunda División players
Yugoslav expatriate footballers
Expatriate footballers in Spain
Yugoslav expatriate sportspeople in Spain